Radomir Milosavljević (born 28 July 1992) is a Serbian professional footballer who plays as a midfielder for Vojvodina.

Club career
Till 2021 Milosavljević played for Greek Super League club AEL, for which he was the team's first captain.

On 8 June 2022 Milosavljević signed a two year contract with Vojvodina.

Career statistics

Honours
Mladost
Serbian First League: 2013–14

References

External links
 Radomir Milosavljević stats at utakmica.rs 
 
 

1992 births
Living people
People from Ćuprija
Association football forwards
Serbian footballers
FK Mladost Lučani players
Serbian First League players
Serbian SuperLiga players
Serbian expatriate footballers
Serbian expatriate sportspeople in Switzerland
Expatriate footballers in Switzerland
Serbian expatriate sportspeople in Greece
Expatriate footballers in Greece
FC Lugano players
FK Vojvodina players
Swiss Super League players
Athlitiki Enosi Larissa F.C. players
Super League Greece players